Anogramma is a genus of ferns in the subfamily Pteridoideae of the family Pteridaceae. It contains about ten species, including:

References

Pteridaceae
Fern genera
Taxonomy articles created by Polbot